Urban Eden is a pressure group based in Milton Keynes, England, formed in 2006. The group states that its aim is to "promote a sustainable expansion to the original masterplan for Milton Keynes". In recent years the expansion of Milton Keynes has moved away from the original design principles of the city; Urban Eden campaigns against this trend, pressuring for new developments to remain true to the original vision for the new city.  the group says that it has over one hundred members, including a number of professional engineers and town planners, as well as some former employees of the Milton Keynes Development Corporation.

Campaigns

According to their main website, Urban Eden's main campaign focuses can be broadly summarised to the following:

Grid roads
Building density
Tree protection
The redway network
Pedestrian underpasses and footbridges
The Boulevards of Central Milton Keynes
The linear park system
Architecture
Layout of expansion areas

The first two of these points are expanded below.

The Grid System

One of Urban Eden's primary goals is the continued expansion of the Milton Keynes grid road system. The system, unique in the UK, is based around a grid layout of national speed limit, landscaped roads, many of them dual carriageways, situated on average 1 km apart. The current plans for the expansion of Milton Keynes do not extend this system, instead constructing  roads that Milton Keynes Partnership describe as 'city streets', which form the spine roads of the new districts. The group argues that these city streets do not provide sufficient room for future expansion, restrict pedestrian, cycle and car movement and are dangerous. They argue that the grid system, with its lack of frontage development and its regular pedestrian/cycle underpasses, provides a much safer pedestrian/cycle environment and allows all modes of transport to move more freely. On the other hand, Milton Keynes Partnership argue that the grid system may not be the most sustainable transport system for the expansion areas, and creates a barrier effect between residential areas.

Building density

Milton Keynes, from its conception in 1967, has always been a low-density city. Notwithstanding the various areas of parkland dotted around the city, the residential districts themselves are laid out with generous amounts of open space for a British settlement. However, as is the current policy across the UK, developments have tended towards higher densities over the last decade. Recently Central Milton Keynes has seen the construction of tower blocks, something which was excluded in the original city masterplan. New districts such as Broughton have been built to much higher densities than ever before seen in Milton Keynes. Milton Keynes Partnership, a subsidiary of Homes and communities agency and the organisation in control of the expansion of Milton Keynes, argues that higher densities are necessary to deliver high-quality transport systems and meet housing targets. Urban Eden argues that the high-density districts have the potential to become "instant slums" and are out of place in a city which has always been built at a low density. High-density districts are now being built in many towns and cities across the country, and this debate is not limited to Milton Keynes.

Urban Eden in local media

The group's activities have attracted much attention from the local media, as well as a small amount of national media attention. The group's chairman, Theo Chalmers, writes a monthly column for a local business magazine on the matters campaigned on by the group. In 2006, the group ran a two-page article in the MK Citizen named "plane crash", describing the cutting of the plane trees in Central Milton Keynes.  All in all the group's efforts have resulted in much debate within the Milton Keynes, and their campaigns have drawn the attention of local and regional planning bodies. At least one development within Milton Keynes, the former Millennium Community at Oakgrove, was changed to protect a stretch of grid road that was proposed to be downgraded, although it is unclear as to whether or not this was a result of Urban Eden's campaigning.

References

External links

 
Website of Milton Keynes Partnership
MK NEWS local newspaper-destruction of trees in Milton Keynes
 – Article from the MK Citizen local newspaper in 2007 referring to Urban Eden and the destruction of trees in MK
 – Article on MKWeb polling for opinion on independent shops v chain stores

Organisations based in Milton Keynes
Advocacy groups in the United Kingdom
 Political advocacy groups in the United Kingdom
 Political advocacy groups in England